Lilian Pérez Sandoval (born 27 April 1999) is a Cuban footballer who plays as a forward for the Cuba women's national team.

Club career
Pérez has played for Pococí in Costa Rica.

International career
Pérez capped for Cuba at senior level during the 2018 CONCACAF Women's Championship (and its qualification).

References

1999 births
Living people
Cuban women's footballers
Women's association football forwards
Cuba women's international footballers
Cuban expatriate footballers
Cuban expatriate sportspeople in Costa Rica
Expatriate women's footballers in Costa Rica
21st-century Cuban women